John David Landis (born August 3, 1950) is an American comedy, horror, and fantasy filmmaker and actor. He is best known for the comedy films that he has directed – such as The Kentucky Fried Movie (1977), National Lampoon's Animal House (1978), The Blues Brothers (1980), An American Werewolf in London (1981), Trading Places (1983), Three Amigos (1986), Coming to America (1988) and Beverly Hills Cop III (1994), and for directing Michael Jackson's music videos for "Thriller" (1983) and "Black or White" (1991).

Early life
Landis was born into a Jewish family in Chicago, Illinois, the son of Shirley Levine (née Magaziner) and Marshall Landis, an interior designer and decorator. Landis and his parents relocated to Los Angeles when he was four months old. Though spending his childhood in California, Landis still refers to Chicago as his home town; he is a fan of the Chicago White Sox baseball team.

When Landis was a young boy, he watched The 7th Voyage of Sinbad, which inspired him to become a director:I had complete suspension of disbelief—really, I was eight years old and it transported me. I was on that beach running from that dragon, fighting that Cyclops. It just really dazzled me, and I bought it completely. And so, I actually sat through it twice and when I got home, I asked my mom, "Who does that? Who makes the movie?"Landis, John. Interview by Robert K. Elder. The Film That Changed My Life. By Robert K. Elder. Chicago: Chicago Review Press, 2011. N. p. 223. Print.

Career

Early
Landis began his film career working as a mailboy at 20th Century Fox. He worked as a "go-fer" and then as an assistant director during filming MGM's Kelly's Heroes in Yugoslavia in 1969; he replaced the film's original assistant director, who became ill and was sent home. During that time Landis became acquainted with actors Don Rickles and Donald Sutherland, both of whom would later work in his films. Following Kelly's Heroes, Landis worked on several films that were shot in Europe (especially in Italy and the United Kingdom), including Once Upon a Time in the West, El Condor and A Town Called Bastard (a.k.a. A Town Called Hell). Landis also worked as a stunt double.

Aged 21, Landis made his directorial debut with Schlock. The film, which he also wrote and appeared in, is a tribute to monster movies. The gorilla suit for the film was made by Rick Baker—the beginning of a long-term collaboration between Landis and Baker. Though completed in 1971, Schlock was not released until 1973 after it caught the attention of Johnny Carson. A fan of the film, Carson invited Landis on The Tonight Show and showed clips to help promote it. Schlock has since gained a cult following, but Landis has described the film as "terrible".

Landis was hired by Eon Productions to write a screen treatment for The Spy Who Loved Me, but his screenplay of James Bond foiling a kidnapping of the Pope in Latin America was rejected by Albert R. Broccoli for satirizing the Catholic Church. Landis was then hired to direct The Kentucky Fried Movie after David Zucker saw his Tonight Show appearance. The film was inspired by the satirical sketch comedy of shows like Monty Python, Free the Army, The National Lampoon Radio Hour and Saturday Night Live. It is notable for being the first film written by the Zucker, Abrahams and Zucker team, who would later have success with Airplane! and The Naked Gun trilogy.

1978–1981
Sean Daniel, an assistant to Universal executive Thom Mount, saw The Kentucky Fried Movie and recommended Landis to direct Animal House based on that. Landis says of the screenplay, "It was really literally one of the funniest things I ever read. It had a nasty edge like National Lampoon. I told him it was wonderful, extremely smart and funny, but everyone's a pig for one thing." While Animal House received mixed reviews, it was a massive financial success, earning over $120 million at the domestic box office, making it the highest grossing comedy film of its time. Its success started the "gross-out" film genre, which became one of Hollywood's staples. It also featured the screen debuts of John Belushi, Karen Allen and Kevin Bacon.

In 1980, Landis co-wrote and directed The Blues Brothers, a comedy starring John Belushi and Dan Aykroyd. It featured musical numbers by R&B and soul legends James Brown, Cab Calloway, Aretha Franklin, Ray Charles and John Lee Hooker. It was, at the time, one of the most expensive films ever made, costing almost $30 million (for comparison, Steven Spielberg's contemporary film 1941 cost $35 million). It is speculated that Spielberg and Landis engaged in a rivalry, the goal of which was to make the more expensive film. The rivalry might have been a friendly one, as Spielberg makes a cameo appearance in Blues Brothers (as the unnamed desk clerk near the end) and Landis had made a cameo in 1941 as a messenger.

In 1981, Landis wrote and directed another cult-status film, the comedy-horror An American Werewolf in London. It was perhaps Landis's most personal project; he had been planning to make it since 1969, while in Yugoslavia working on Kelly's Heroes. It was another commercial success for Landis and inspired studios to put comedic elements in their horror films.

Twilight Zone deaths

On July 23, 1982, during the filming of Twilight Zone, actor Vic Morrow and child extras Myca Dinh Le (age 7) and Renee Shin-Yi Chen (age 6) were killed in an accident involving an out-of-control helicopter. The three were caught under the aircraft when it crashed, and Morrow and one child were decapitated. The National Transportation Safety Board reported in October 1984:
 

Despite insisting that the deaths were the result of an accident, Landis' aggressive and cavalier behavior on set likely contributed to the crash. Camera operators filming the scene testified to Landis being a very imperious director, a "yeller and screamer" on set. He was also glib about the dangerous set environment created by shooting at night with a helicopter and many large explosions. During a take three hours before the incident, helicopter pilot Dorcey Wingo (a veteran of the Vietnam War) told Landis that the fireballs were too large and too close to the helicopter. To this, Landis responded ″You ain’t seen nothing yet.″ With special effects explosions blasting around them, the helicopter descended over Morrow, Le, and Chen. Witnesses testified Landis was still shouting for the helicopter to fly "Lower! Lower!" moments before it crashed.  

Landis and four other crew members were charged with involuntary manslaughter. The prosecutors demonstrated that Landis was reckless and had not warned the parents, cast or crew of the children's and Morrow's proximity to explosives, or of limitations on their working hours. He admitted that he had violated California law regulating the employment of children by using the children after hours, and conceded that that was wrong, but still denied culpability. Numerous members of the film crew testified that the director was warned of the extreme hazard by technicians but ignored them. After a nine-month jury trial during 1986 and 1987, Landis, represented by criminal defense attorneys Harland Braun and James F. Neal, and the other crew members were acquitted of the charges.

Landis was later reprimanded for circumventing California's child labor laws in hiring the two children. The incident resulted in stricter safety measures and enforcement of child labor laws in California. The parents of the children sued, and eventually settled out of court with the studio for $2 million per family. Morrow's children, one of them being actress Jennifer Jason Leigh, who was 20 at the time, also settled out of court for an undisclosed sum.

During an interview with journalist Giulia D'Agnolo Vallan, Landis said, "When you read about the accident, they say we were blowing up huts—which we weren't—and that debris hit the tail rotor of the helicopter—which it didn't. The FBI Crime Lab, who was working for the prosecution, finally figured out that the tail rotor delaminated, which is why the pilot lost control. The special effects man who made the mistake by setting off a fireball at the wrong time was never charged."

Following the accident, Steven Spielberg ended his friendship with Landis.

Subsequent film career
Trading Places, a Prince and the Pauper-style comedy starring Dan Aykroyd and Eddie Murphy, was filmed directly after the Twilight Zone accident. After filming ended, Landis and his family went to London. The film did well enough for Landis' image and career to improve, along with his involvement with Michael Jackson's "Thriller".

Next, Landis directed Into the Night, starring Jeff Goldblum, Michelle Pfeiffer and David Bowie, and appeared in the film, which was inspired by Hitchcock productions, as an Iranian hitman. To promote the film, Landis collaborated with Jeff Okun to direct a documentary film called B.B. King "Into the Night".

His next film, Spies Like Us, (starring co-writer Dan Aykroyd and Chevy Chase) was an homage to the Road to ... films of Bob Hope and Bing Crosby. Hope made a cameo in the Landis film, portraying himself.

In 1986, Landis directed Three Amigos, which featured Chevy Chase, Martin Short and Steve Martin. He then co-directed and produced the 1987 satirical comedy film Amazon Women on the Moon, which parodies the experience of watching low-budget films on late-night television.

Landis next directed the 1988 Eddie Murphy film Coming to America, which was commercially successful. It was also the subject of Buchwald v. Paramount, a civil suit filed by Art Buchwald in 1990 against the film's producers. Buchwald claimed that the concept for the film had been stolen from a 1982 script that Paramount optioned from Buchwald, and won the breach of contract action.

In 1991, Landis directed Sylvester Stallone in Oscar, based on a  stage play. Oscar recreates a 1930s-era film, including the gestures along with bit acts and with some slapstick, as an homage to old Hollywood films. In 1992, Landis directed Innocent Blood, a horror-crime film. In 1994, Landis directed Eddie Murphy in Beverly Hills Cop III, their third collaboration following  Trading Places and Coming to America. In 1996, he directed The Stupids and then returned to Universal to direct Blues Brothers 2000 in 1998 with John Goodman and, for the fifth time in a Landis film, Dan Aykroyd, who also appeared in Landis's film Susan's Plan, released that same year. None of the above six films scored well with critics or audiences.

Burke and Hare was released in 2010, as Landis's first theatrical release in 12 years.

In August 2011, Landis said he would return to horror and would be writing a new film. He was the executive producer on the comedy horror film Some Guy Who Kills People.

Music videos

Landis has directed several music videos. He was approached by Michael Jackson to make a video for his song "Thriller". The resulting video significantly impacted MTV and the concept of music videos; it has won numerous awards, including the Video Vanguard Award for The Greatest Video in the History of the World. In 2009 (months before Jackson died), Landis sued the Jackson estate in a dispute over royalties for the video; he claimed to be owed at least four years' worth of royalties.

In 1991, Landis collaborated again with Michael Jackson on the music video for the song "Black or White".

Television
Landis has been active in television as the executive producer (and often director) of the series Dream On (1990), Weird Science (1994), Sliders (1995), Honey, I Shrunk the Kids: The TV Show (1997), Campus Cops (1995), The Lost World (1998), Masters of Horror, and various episodes of Psych. He also made commercials for DirecTV, Taco Bell, Coca-Cola, Pepsi, Kellogg's, and Disney. In 2011 he made an appearance in Reece Shearsmith and Steve Pemberton's television series Psychoville. In June 2020, Landis signed on to direct and executive produce the streaming series Superhero Kindergarten.

Documentaries
Landis made his first documentary, Coming Soon in 1982; it was only released on VHS. Next, he co-directed B.B. King "Into the Night" (1985) and in 2002 directed Where Are They Now?: A Delta Alumni Update, which can be seen as a part of the Animal House DVD extras. Initially, his documentaries were only made to promote his feature films. Later in his career he became more serious about the oeuvre and made Slasher (2004), Mr. Warmth: The Don Rickles Project (2007) and Starz Inside: Ladies or Gentlemen (2009). These documentaries were filmed for television; Landis won a 2008 Emmy Award for Mr. Warmth. He worked on the Making of Thriller, which was filmed in 3-D. Landis appeared in the Spanish documentary The Man Who Saw Frankenstein Cry, which covered the career of Spanish movie director Paul Naschy.

Personal life
Landis is married to Deborah Nadoolman, a costume designer. They have two children: Max and Rachel. In a BBC Radio interview, he stated that he is an atheist. The family lives in Beverly Hills, California. They had purchased Rock Hudson's estate in Beverly Crest after the actor died there from complications of AIDS. The property was later sold to Microsoft co-founder Paul Allen.

In 2009, Landis signed a petition in support of director Roman Polanski, who had been detained while traveling to a film festival in relation to his 1977 sexual abuse charges, which the petition argued would undermine the tradition of film festivals as a place for works to be shown "freely and safely", and that arresting filmmakers traveling to neutral countries could open the door "for actions of which no-one can know the effects."

Filmography

Film

Acting roles

Television

Acting roles

Music videos

Other works
 Universal 360: A Cinesphere Spectacular (2006)

Awards

Landis's work has received recognition from the Academy of Television Arts & Sciences (ATAS); the Academy of Science Fiction, Fantasy and Horror Films; the National Cable Television Association; the National Association for the Advancement of Colored People (NAACP); the Golden Raspberry Awards; the Rondo Hatton Classic Horror Awards; the Amiens International Film Festival; the Cognac Festival du Film Policier; the Fantafestival; the Fantasporto Film Festival; the Italian National Syndicate of Film Journalists; the Monte-Carlo Comedy Film Festival; the Phoenix Film Festival; and the Sitges – Catalonian International Film Festival.

Wins

 1982 – Fantafestival Award for Best Film (Schlock)
 1985 – Cognac Festival du Film Policier Award for Special Jury Prize (Into the Night)
 1988 – NAACP Image Award for Outstanding Motion Picture (Coming to America)
 1992 – CableACE Award for Comedy Series (Dream On)
 2004 – Phoenix Film Festival Award for (Cooper Wing Tribute Award)
 2004 – Sitges – Catalonian International Film Festival Award for (Time-Machine Honorary Award)
 2008 – Primetime Emmy Award for Outstanding Variety, Music or Comedy Special (Mr. Warmth: The Don Rickles Project)
 2010 – Monte-Carlo Comedy Film Festival Award (Career Award)
 2015 – Amiens International Film Festival Award for Golden Unicorn (Career Achievement)
 2017 – Monte-Carlo Comedy Film Festival Award for (Comedy Legend Award)
Lifetime achievement award
 2021 – Leopard of Honour (Pardo d'onore Manor award) at 74th Locarno Film Festival, Switzerland

Nominations

 1982 – Saturn Award for Best Writing (An American Werewolf in London)
 1984 – CableACE Award for Documentary Special (The Making of 'Thriller')
 1984 – Fantasporto Award for International Fantasy Film Award (Twilight Zone: The Movie)
 1984 – Italian National Syndicate of Film Journalists Award for Best Foreign Director (Trading Places)
 1991 – CableACE Award for Comedy Series (Dream On)
 1992 – Golden Raspberry Award for Worst Director (Oscar)
 1993 – CableACE Award for Comedy Series (Dream On)
 1994 – CableACE Award for Comedy Series (Dream On)
 1995 – CableACE Award for Comedy Series (Dream On)
 1995 – Cable ACE Award for Directing a Comedy Series ("The Courtship of Martin's Father") (Dream On)
 1995 – CableACE Award for Comedy Series (Dream On)
 1995 – CableACE Award for Directing a Comedy Series ("Off-Off Broadway Bound") (Dream On)
 1995 – Golden Raspberry Award for Worst Director (Beverly Hills Cop III)
 1997 – Golden Raspberry Award for Worst Director (The Stupids)
 2012 – Rondo Hatton Classic Horror Award for Best Film (Burke and Hare)

Archives
The moving image collection of John Landis is held at the Academy Film Archive.  The film material at the Academy Film Archive is complemented by photographs, artwork, and posters found in the John Landis papers at the academy's Margaret Herrick Library.

References

Further reading
 Alberto Farina (1995). John Landis. Il Castoro. 
 Giulia D'Agnolo Vallan (2008). John Landis. M Press.

External links

 
 
 80's Movie Rewind Profile about Director
 Daily Variety, May 24, 1994: Spotlight on John Landis — Billion Dollar Director

Interviews
 Interview with John Landis

About Twilight Zone accident
 All about The Twilight Zone tragedy
 

1950 births
Living people
American atheists
American film directors
American film producers
American male comedians
American male film actors
American male screenwriters
American music video directors
American television directors
Comedy film directors
Fantasy film directors
Horror film directors
Jewish American atheists
Jewish American writers
Male actors from Chicago
People acquitted of manslaughter
Screenwriters from Illinois
Television producers from Illinois